Chapchai Nirat (born 5 June 1983) is a Thai professional golfer.

Chapchai is the son of a Thai national team golfer, and turned professional in 1998 as a fifteen-year-old. He won for the first time as a pro at the 2004 Genting Masters in Malaysia. He joined the Asian Tour in 2005, and had a second-place finish in his rookie season. In 2007 he won the TCL Classic, which is co-sanctioned by the Asian Tour and the European Tour and the Hana Bank Vietnam Masters. He was the third Thai to win a European Tour event.

In March 2009, Nirat shot 32-under-par over 72 holes to claim the SAIL Open, setting a new Asian Tour record for the best 72-hole score.

Professional wins (10)

European Tour wins (1)

1Co-sanctioned by the Asian Tour

Asian Tour wins (4)

1Co-sanctioned by the European Tour

Asian Tour playoff record (1–1)

Asian Development Tour wins (1)

1Co-sanctioned by the All Thailand Golf Tour

All Thailand Golf Tour wins (4)
2007 Singha Pattaya Open
2014 Singha Championship, Singha Chiang Mai Open1
2016 Thongchai Jaidee Foundation2
1Co-sanctioned by the ASEAN PGA Tour
2Co-sanctioned by the Asian Development Tour

Thailand PGA Tour wins (1)

Other wins (1)
2004 Genting Masters (Malaysia)

Results in World Golf Championships

"T" = Tied
Note that the HSBC Champions did not become a WGC event until 2009.

References

External links

Chapchai Nirat
Asian Tour golfers
European Tour golfers
1983 births
Living people